Giolla na Naomh Mág Samhradháin (the Second), was chief of the McGovern Clan and Baron or Lord of Tullyhaw barony, County Cavan from c.1231 - 1240.

Ancestry

His ancestry was Giolla na Naomh son of Giolla Íosa Mág Samhradháin son of Giolla na Naomh Mág Samhradháin, the First, son of Muireadhach Mág Samhradhán who was the son of Samhradhán mac Conchobhar mac Fearghal mac Flann mac Aonghus mac Conchobhar mac Tadhg Tir mac Ruarc mac Íomhaor mac Cosgrach mac Dúnghal mac Oireachtach mac Eochaidh (Teallach n-Eachach or Tullyhaw is named after the latter).

Description

Poem 2, stanza 7, by Giolla Pádraig mac Naimhin, written c.1290-1298, in the Book of Magauran describes him as fresh Giolla na Naomh.

Family

His son was Donnchadh ‘Cime’ Mág Samhradháin, who was chief of the clan from 1258 – 1269.

References

Irish lords
People from County Cavan
13th-century Irish people